Robert Mambo George Randu Mumba (born 25 October 1978 in Mombasa) is a Kenyan former footballer. He is a former player of Swedish club GIF Sundsvall.

Career
His previous club (up until the spring of 2006) was Viking FK in Norway. His previous clubs include Örebro SK, BK Häcken and K.A.A. Gent, and he played for Coast Stars, Nyoka FC and Kenya Pipeline FC before moving to Europe. On 8 February 2011 he resigned his contract with GIF Sundsvall and joined Dalkurd FF.

International career
Mambo has played 50 international matches and scored 15 goals for Kenya. He played in the 2004 African Nations Cup. Mambo became the skipper of the Kenyan national team after the retirement of Musa Otieno.

Notes

1978 births
Living people
Sportspeople from Mombasa
Kenyan footballers
Association football midfielders
Bandari F.C. (Kenya) players
K.A.A. Gent players
Coast Stars F.C. players
Örebro SK players
Viking FK players
BK Häcken players
GIF Sundsvall players
Umeå FC players
Dalkurd FF players
Belgian Pro League players
Allsvenskan players
Eliteserien players
Kenya international footballers
2004 African Cup of Nations players
Kenyan expatriate footballers
Kenyan expatriate sportspeople in Sweden
Kenyan expatriate sportspeople in Norway
Kenyan expatriate sportspeople in Belgium
Expatriate footballers in Sweden
Expatriate footballers in Norway
Expatriate footballers in Belgium
Kenyan football managers
Dalkurd FF managers
Kenyan expatriate football managers
Expatriate football managers in Sweden
K.R.C. Gent players